Facebook Revolution may refer to different revolutions and protests, which were coordinated using Facebook:

2009 Iranian presidential election protests,  following the 2009 Iranian presidential election against the disputed victory of Iranian President Mahmoud Ahmadinejad
Media curbs and usage of social networking sites in Kashmir, India, protests against the "Bloody Summer" of 2010
Egyptian revolution of 2011, overthrowing President Hosni Mubarak
Tunisian Revolution, overthrowing President Zine El Abidine Ben Ali, 2011
 2013_protests_in_Brazil, protests in Brazil against increases in public transportation fare, in 2013
Euromaidan, a wave of demonstrations and civil unrest in Ukraine, 2013
2014 Romanian presidential election, protests over the presidential elections in November 2014
2014 Hong Kong protests or "Umbrella Revolution", a series of sit-in street demonstrations protesting proposed reforms to the Hong Kong electoral system
2017 pro-jallikattu protests, India, against the Supreme Court's order to ban a traditional Tamil bull-taming sport
2021 storming of the United States Capitol, on January 6, 2021, rioters supporting United States President Donald Trump's attempts to overturn the 2020 presidential election

Facebook